Flat Branch is a  long 1st order tributary to the Hyco River in Halifax County, Virginia.  Flat Branch joins Hyco River in John H. Kerr Reservoir (Buggs Island Reservoir in Virginia).

Course
Flat Branch rises about 1.5 miles west of Aarons Creek, Virginia and then flows north-northeast to join the Hyco River in John H. Kerr Reservoir about 1 mile northwest of Aarons Creek.

Watershed
Flat Branch drains  of area, receives about 45.4 in/year of precipitation, has a wetness index of 410.39, and is about 70% forested.

See also
List of rivers of Virginia

References

Rivers of Virginia
Rivers of Halifax County, Virginia
Tributaries of the Roanoke River